Heartland Village is a residential development located close to the geographic center of Staten Island, one of the five boroughs of New York City, USA.  The name is also often used to denote the immediately surrounding area.

Heartland Village is located within the New Springville neighborhood of Staten Island. Heartland Village is originally named for a housing development created in the late 1960s which occupied a square-shaped area bounded by Richmond Avenue, Rockland Avenue, Richmond Hill Road, and Forest Hill Road, exclusive of the various shopping centers also located therein. The Staten Island Mall is located south of Richmond Hill Road.

Heartland Village's proximity to the Staten Island Mall and many other smaller shopping centers nearby has made it one of the island's most attractive residential communities; indeed, the region has emerged as the island's second largest commercial and administrative hub, after St. George.

History
New Springville was originally a rural and wooded community.  The construction of the Verrazzano-Narrows Bridge (opened in 1964) led to the establishment on Staten Island of many large residential development communities.  One of the largest development communities to emerge was the Heartland Village community.  Construction of the Heartland Village Community started in the late 1960s and would continue through the early 1980s.

Most of the homes in Heartland Village consist of two family homes with six or seven rooms in the main home, with three bedrooms.   These are medium-sized homes.  In recent years, with most new construction has been focused on larger homes or condominiums, these medium-sized homes have become particularly desirable.

Education
With the increasing residential population, a need arose for new schools to be built in the community.  In 1976, two such schools opened: An elementary school, P.S. 69, the Daniel D. Tompkins School and I.S. 72, the Rocco Laurie Intermediate School.

Transportation
Heartland Village is served by various local and express buses. The  local buses and  express buses travel along Richmond Avenue.  The  local buses and  express buses run along Travis Avenue and Merry Mount Street.

Demographics
As of the 2010 census, the demographics were as follows: 
76.48% White, 1.94% Black, 16.17% Asian, 3.22% Some Other Race, and 1.99% Two or More Races. Hispanics or Latinos of any race made up 12.10% of the population. The population density was 21,473.61 people per square mile, with a density of housing units of 8,250.96 per square mile.

References

Neighborhoods in Staten Island